The 1998 World Weightlifting Championships were held in Lahti, Finland from November 7 to November 15. The men's competition in the super heavyweight division (+105 kg) was staged on 15 November 1998. The defending champion was Andrey Chemerkin from Russia, who won the title in the men's +108 kg division a year earlier at the 1997 World Championships in Chiang Mai, Thailand.

Medalists

Records

Results

References
Results
Weightlifting World Championships Seniors Statistics, Pages 18 

1998 World Weightlifting Championships